Claudia Giovine and Despina Papamichail were the defending champions, but chose not to participate.

İpek Soylu and Xu Shilin won the title, defeating Réka Luca Jani and Sofia Shapatava in the final, 7–5, 6–1.

Seeds

Draw

References 
 Draw

Torneo Internazionale Femminile Antico Tiro a Volo - Doubles